Lahore American school  (commonly shortened to LAS) is an American high school based in Lahore, Punjab, Pakistan. It is one of the few international schools in the city. LAS is a co-educational school.

About
The Lahore American School (LAS) is a school that offers a program for students preschool aged through grade 12. The school is open to any and all nationalities.  Selective admission is based on prior academic achievement, standardized test scores, a writing sample, and a personal interview. Founded to serve overseas American students, LAS is an international institution following an American college preparatory program. The curriculum is standards-based as consistent with contemporary curricula in the United States.

The school closely follows the American school system in social terms as well as academia, and hosts over 400 students of various nationalities. The teachers are from diverse national backgrounds and highly experienced in overseas education.

Of the 2007-2008 intake, 4% are American citizens, 92% are Pakistani citizens and 3% are Korean citizens 1% are citizens from other nations.

The main language of instruction at LAS is English, while French, Urdu, and Mandarin Chinese are taught as foreign languages. The academic calendar runs on a two-semester basis, the first going from August to December and the second from January to May. Due to the diverse nature of the student population, both local and international holidays are observed and the school is respectively closed.

History
The school was founded in 1956 by a parent group to offer American college-preparatory education for students. Since June 1985, Lahore American School is accredited by the Middle States Association of Colleges and Schools.

Notable alumni

 Mohsin Hamid
 Daniyal Mueenuddin
 Zia Chishti
 Moonis Elahi

See also
Americans in Pakistan

Notes

References

External links
LAS homepage
LAS on US state-department page

American international schools in Pakistan
Schools in Lahore
Educational institutions established in 1956
1956 establishments in Pakistan
The Mall, Lahore